Bhawanipur Bihar railway station is a railway station on the Howrah–New Jalpaiguri line of Katihar railway division of Northeast Frontier Railway zone. It is situated at Bhawanipur of Katihar district in the Indian state of Bihar. Number of passengers trains stop at Bhawanipur Bihar railway station.

References

Railway stations in Katihar district
Katihar railway division